Gudmundur Svavar (Bo) Bodvarsson (November 11, 1952 – November 29, 2006) was an Icelandic hydrogeologist who is known for his work with the Yucca Mountain nuclear waste repository. From 1980 until his death, he was affiliated with the Berkeley Lab, serving as the director of its earth science division from 2001. He was also a prolific writer on the subject of hydrology.

References

1952 births
2006 deaths
Deaths from pulmonary embolism
Icelandic civil engineers
Hydrogeologists